Newton Moore Littlejohn (July 23, 1823February 27, 1916) was an American politician and member of the Wisconsin State Senate from 1864 to 1870.  A Republican, he represented Walworth County.

Biography
Littlejohn was born on July 23, 1823, in Litchfield, New York. On September 8, 1848, he married Jane Sophia Newton. They had two children. Littlejohn died on February 27, 1916, and was buried in Whitewater, Wisconsin.

Career
Littlejohn represented the 12th District in the Senate from 1864 to 1870. He was elected in 1863 on the National Union Party ticket, created in the midst of the American Civil War. He continued as a Republican after the war.  Previously, he had been elected Chairman of Whitewater (town), Wisconsin in 1861.

References

External links
 

People from Herkimer County, New York
People from Whitewater, Wisconsin
Republican Party Wisconsin state senators
Mayors of places in Wisconsin
1823 births
1916 deaths
Burials in Wisconsin
19th-century American politicians